Inger Skou was a Hansa A Type cargo ship which was built as Cuxhaven in 1943 by Deutsche Werft, Hamburg, Germany. She was seized as a prize of war in 1945, passing to the United States. She was allocated to Denmark in 1948 and was renamed Inger Skou. She ran aground and sank in 1952.

Description

The ship was propelled by a compound steam engine built by Deutsche Werft.

History
Cuxhaven was a Hansa A Type cargo ship built in 1943 as yard number 423 by Deutsche Werft, Hamburg She was launched on 14 July 1943 and completed on 28 September. Her port of registry was Hamburg.

On 9 October, Cuxhaven was severely damaged in an air raid at Gotenhafen. She was towed to the Isselfjord. In 1945, she was seized as a prize by the United States. In 1948 she was sold to Denmark and was rebuilt by HSM. A Lentz steam engine was installed. She was sold to Dampskibsselskabet af 1937 A/S - Ove Skou and was renamed Inger Skou. Her port of registry was Copenhagen and the Code Letters OYGS were allocated.

On 3 June 1952, Inger Skou ran aground on the Chinchorro Bank, off the coast of British Honduras and sank. She was on a voyage from New Orleans, Louisiana, United States to Belize City, British Honduras. The loss was attributed to careless navigation.

References

1943 ships
Ships built in Germany
World War II merchant ships of Germany
Maritime incidents in October 1943
Steamships of Germany
Merchant ships of the United States
Steamships of the United States
Merchant ships of Denmark
Steamships of Denmark
Maritime incidents in 1952
Shipwrecks in the Caribbean Sea